The meridian 23° west of Greenwich is a line of longitude that extends from the North Pole across the Arctic Ocean, Greenland, Iceland, the Atlantic Ocean, the Southern Ocean, and Antarctica to the South Pole.

The 23rd meridian west forms a great circle with the 157th meridian east.

From Pole to Pole
Starting at the North Pole and heading south to the South Pole, the 23rd meridian west passes through:

{| class="wikitable plainrowheaders"
! scope="col" width="125" | Co-ordinates
! scope="col" | Country, territory or sea
! scope="col" | Notes
|-
| style="background:#b0e0e6;" | 
! scope="row" style="background:#b0e0e6;" | Arctic Ocean
| style="background:#b0e0e6;" |
|-
| 
! scope="row" | 
| Herlufsholm Strand (Peary Land)
|-
| style="background:#b0e0e6;" | 
! scope="row" style="background:#b0e0e6;" | Independence Fjord
| style="background:#b0e0e6;" |
|-
| 
! scope="row" | 
| Passing through Danmark Fjord
|-
| style="background:#b0e0e6;" | 
! scope="row" style="background:#b0e0e6;" | Kejser Franz Joseph Fjord
| style="background:#b0e0e6;" |
|-valign="top"
| 
! scope="row" | 
| Ymer Island, Geographical Society Island and Traill Island
|-
| style="background:#b0e0e6;" | 
! scope="row" style="background:#b0e0e6;" | King Oscar Fjord
| style="background:#b0e0e6;" |
|-
| 
! scope="row" | 
| Jameson Land peninsula
|-
| style="background:#b0e0e6;" | 
! scope="row" style="background:#b0e0e6;" | Scoresby Sund
| style="background:#b0e0e6;" |
|-
| 
! scope="row" | 
|
|-
| style="background:#b0e0e6;" | 
! scope="row" style="background:#b0e0e6;" | Atlantic Ocean
| style="background:#b0e0e6;" | Greenland Sea
|-
| 
! scope="row" | 
| Westfjords peninsula
|-
| style="background:#b0e0e6;" | 
! scope="row" style="background:#b0e0e6;" | Ísafjarðardjúp
| style="background:#b0e0e6;" |
|-
| 
! scope="row" | 
| Westfjords peninsula
|-
| style="background:#b0e0e6;" | 
! scope="row" style="background:#b0e0e6;" | Breiðafjörður
| style="background:#b0e0e6;" |
|-
| 
! scope="row" | 
| Snæfellsnes peninsula
|-valign="top"
| style="background:#b0e0e6;" | 
! scope="row" style="background:#b0e0e6;" | Atlantic Ocean
| style="background:#b0e0e6;" | Passing just west of the island of Sal,  (at ) Passing just west of the island of Boa Vista,  (at ) Passing just east of the island of Maio,  (at )
|-
| style="background:#b0e0e6;" | 
! scope="row" style="background:#b0e0e6;" | Southern Ocean
| style="background:#b0e0e6;" |
|-
| 
! scope="row" | Antarctica
| British Antarctic Territory, claimed by 
|-
|}

See also
22nd meridian west
24th meridian west

w023 meridian west